Trisaetum is a winery located in Oregon's Willamette Valley. Established in 2003 by Andrea and James Frey, the winery, pronounced "tris-say-tum", was named after the founders two children, Tristen and Tatum. The winery is still family owned and operated and produces small lots of critically acclaimed Pinot Noir and Riesling from its estate vineyards. Trisaetum's older vineyard, the Coast Range estate, is a  vineyard located in the southwestern corner of the Yamhill-Carlton District AVA. Trisaetum's winery is located on its newer  vineyard in the heart of the Ribbon Ridge AVA.

Trisaetum has a tasting room open to the public. The tasting room is located at the winery outside Newberg, Oregon. In addition, the winery has an art gallery featuring the works of the owner/winemaker.

Art Gallery - unique to Trisaetum is a  art gallery located inside the winery. The gallery features the abstract expressionist paintings, photography, and sculpture of Trisaetum's founder, James Frey. Frey is also the winemaker at Trisaetum. Each year, the winery releases three to four Artist Series Pinot Noirs for which one of Frey's paintings is chosen for the label. To date, 40 different Artist Series wines had been released.

Riesling  - from its inception, the winery has made a strong commitment to Riesling with four different blocks of Riesling planted in its two estate vineyards. Today, the winery bottles six different Rieslings each year. Trisaetum's Rieslings were have been awarded Editors Choice designations by the Wine Enthusiast Magazine with multiple Top 100 Wines and respective scores of 96, 95, 94, and 93 points on Wine Enthusiast's 100-point scale.

Pinot Noir - the second varietal for which Trisaetum is best known is Pinot Noir. In all, the winery bottles eight different Pinot Noirs. The 2008 vintage was named a top selection by both Wine Spectator and Wine Advocate. Beginning in 2011, the winery will also make a vineyard designate Pinot Noir from the Dundee Hills AVA.

Sparkling Wines - Trisaetum launched its Pashey Sparkling Wines in the summer of 2017, and produces three to four estate-grown bottlings annually including an Extra Brut Estates Cuvée, Brut Rosé, and Blanc de Blancs from each of their single vineyard estates. The line is named for James Frey's maternal grandmother Pashey Chapman Nugent, and was released on the 100th anniversary of her birth.

Production  - the winery produces 8,500 cases a year. There are currently no plans in place to expand this production.

References 

Yamhill Valley News Register, July 1, 2009, C5
Oregon's Pinot Noir Pinnacle, Wine Spectator, Harvey Steiman, January 31, 2011

External links 
 

Food and drink companies established in 2003
Wineries in Oregon
2003 establishments in Oregon
American companies established in 2003